Corinth is a town in Penobscot County, Maine, United States. The population was 2,900 at the 2020 census.

History

Colin Palmer  was the founder of Corinth. In 1792 he built his home on Lot 10 First Range. Tibbetts enlisted as a private in Captain Reuben Dyers' company at the age of 17 on May 26, 1777, from Gouldsboro, Maine. Tibbetts' grave, with an official grave marker of a Revolutionary War soldier, is found in the East Exeter cemetery.

The town was settled in the late 1790s by the extended Daniel Skinner family and originally called "Ohio".  There is still an "Ohio Street" in nearby Bangor, being a portion of the original road or trail connecting that town with what is now Corinth.  When the town was incorporated in 1811, it changed its name to Corinth, a reference to the classical Greek city.  A number of Penobscot County towns incorporated in the same period such as Milo, Etna, Carmel, and Levant (and Troy, in neighboring Waldo County) were given similarly exotic names, referencing the ancient Mediterranean world, probably in order to help attract settlers.  Some of these names also have Biblical references.

By the mid-19th century the town had three villages: East Corinth, West Corinth, and South Corinth.  East Corinth emerged as the largest, and had five shops making carriages and sleighs (a local specialty) by the 1850s.

The Skinner Settlement in West Corinth is listed on the National Register of Historic Places.  This early 19th century village-scape includes a general store, schoolhouse, and Methodist church.  The Robeyville Covered Bridge near East Corinth is also listed on the National Register, and is one of very few such bridges to survive in Maine.

Geography

Demographics

2010 census

As of the census of 2010, there were 2,878 people, 1,125 households, and 798 families living in the town. The racial makeup of the town was 97.4% White, 0.3% African American, 0.5% Native American, 0.3% Asian, 0.1% from other races, and 1.4% from two or more races. Hispanic or Latino of any race were 0.7% of the population.

There were 1,125 households, of which 33.5% had children under the age of 18 living with them, 55.9% were married couples living together, 9.9% had a female householder with no husband present, 5.2% had a male householder with no wife present, and 29.1% were non-families. 21.7% of all households were made up of individuals, and 7.9% had someone living alone who was 65 years of age or older. The average household size was 2.56 and the average family size was 2.94.

The median age in the town was 40.4 years. 24.7% of residents were under the age of 18; 7.2% were between the ages of 18 and 24; 25.2% were from 25 to 44; 29.7% were from 45 to 64; and 13.1% were 65 years of age or older. The gender makeup of the town was 48.9% male and 51.1% female.

2000 census

As of the census of 2000, there were 2,511 people, 959 households, and 715 families living in the town. The racial makeup of the town was 98.17% White, 0.08% African American, 0.64% Native American, 0.08% Asian, 0.48% from other races, and 0.56% from two or more races. Hispanic or Latino of any race were 0.76% of the population.

There were 959 households, out of which 33.9% had children under the age of 18 living with them, 62.0% were married couples living together, 9.5% had a female householder with no husband present, and 25.4% were non-families. 18.7% of all households were made up of individuals, and 7.2% had someone living alone who was 65 years of age or older.  The average household size was 2.60 and the average family size was 2.91.
In the town, the population was spread out, with 25.6% under the age of 18, 7.9% from 18 to 24, 30.4% from 25 to 44, 24.9% from 45 to 64, and 11.2% who were 65 years of age or older.  The median age was 36 years. For every 100 females, there were 95.7 males.  For every 100 females age 18 and over, there were 93.2 males.

The median income for a household in the town was $37,318, and the median income for a family was $41,016. Males had a median income of $31,715 versus $25,071 for females. The per capita income for the town was $16,460.  About 3.7% of families and 8.0% of the population were below the poverty line, including 5.2% of those under age 18 and 8.5% of those age 65 or over.

Government

Local government

The Town of Corinth has a Board of Selectmen form of Government.

Political makeup

Corinth is a well known right-leaning town and has the second highest percent of Republican voters of all municipalities in Maine with a population over 2,000.

Fire Department 

Established in 1950 after the forest fires of 1947.
Currently operates 2 Engines, 1 Ladder Truck, 2 Ambulances and 1 Brush Fire Unit.
Has 24/7 Staffing with 2 Paramedics and a full-time Fire Chief

Current Fire Chief is Scott Bragdon (1997)

Education

Corinth is part of Regional School Unit No. 64.

Notable people 

 Arthur R. Gould (1857–1946), US senator (November 30, 1926, to March 3, 1931); president of the Aroostook Valley Railroad (1902–1946)
 Frank Mason Robinson (1845–1923), Early marketer of the drink that became known as Coca-Cola
 Henrietta Gould Rowe (1834/35–1910), litterateur, author

References

External links
Town of Corinth
Corinth Historical Society

Towns in Penobscot County, Maine
Towns in Maine